William Stevens Bryant (August 30, 1908 – February 9, 1964) was an American jazz bandleader, vocalist, and disc jockey, known as the "Mayor of Harlem".

Biography
Born in Chicago, Illinois, United States, while growing up he took trumpet lessons to little success. His first job in entertainment was dancing in the Whitman Sisters Show in 1926. He worked in various vaudeville productions for the next several years, and in 1934 he appeared in the show Chocolate Revue with Bessie Smith.

In 1934, he put together his first big band, which at times included Teddy Wilson, Cozy Cole, Johnny Russell, Benny Carter, Ben Webster, Eddie Durham, Ram Ramirez, and Taft Jordan. They recorded six times between 1935 and 1938; Bryant sings on 18 of the 26 sides recorded.

Once his ensemble disbanded, Bryant worked in acting and disc jockeying. He recorded R&B in 1945 and led another big band between 1946 and 1948. During September and October 1949, he hosted Uptown Jubilee, a short-lived all-black variety show on CBS-TV . The show aired on Tuesday nights.

In the 1950s he was the emcee at the Apollo Theater in Harlem.

He died of a heart attack in Los Angeles, California on February 9, 1964.

References

Further reading
Scott Yanow, [ Willie Bryant] at AllMusic
.

1908 births
1964 deaths
20th-century African-American male singers
American jazz singers
American jazz bandleaders
Big band bandleaders
Apollo Records artists
Bluebird Records artists